Peleh-ye Baba Hossein (also Romanized as Peleh-ye Bābā Ḩoseyn, Palleh-ye Baba Hoseyn, Poleh-ye Bābā Ḩoseyn, and Pali-Baba-Hussein; also known as Palābwāsil) is a village in Koregah-e- Sharqi Rural District, in the Central District of Khorramabad County, Lorestan Province, Iran. It lies to the southeast of Khorramabad, although the roads leading to it make the distance considerably further. At the 2006 census, its population was 922, in 197 families.

References 

Towns and villages in Khorramabad County